Vladimir Nenadić (20 February 1971 – 20 May 2022) was a Serbian professional footballer who played as a forward.

References

1971 births
2022 deaths
Serbian footballers
Association football forwards
Super League Greece players
OFK Bečej 1918 players
FK Vojvodina players
1. FC Tatran Prešov players
Athinaikos F.C. players
CD Leganés players
F.C. Famalicão players
CD Ribeira Brava players
PFC Belasitsa Petrich players
Debreceni VSC players
Serbian expatriate footballers
Expatriate footballers in Slovakia
Serbian expatriate sportspeople in Slovakia
Expatriate footballers in Greece
Serbian expatriate sportspeople in Greece
Expatriate footballers in Spain
Serbian expatriate sportspeople in Spain
Expatriate footballers in Portugal
Serbian expatriate sportspeople in Portugal
Expatriate footballers in Bulgaria
Serbian expatriate sportspeople in Bulgaria
Expatriate footballers in Hungary
Serbian expatriate sportspeople in Hungary